Grimefighters is a British television series on ITV which follows the life of people with particularly dirty jobs: including working in a sewer, being a binman and hygiene inspectors.

The series predominantly focuses on cleaners working in the areas of Wolverhampton and Barking and Dagenham. The series is narrated by John Sergeant.

Transmissions

Original series

Special
 Celebrity Grimefighers: TX 16 December 2010

References

2009 British television series debuts
2011 British television series endings
ITV documentaries
Television shows set in London
Television shows set in the West Midlands (county)
Television series by ITV Studios
English-language television shows